Oliver L. and Catherine Link House is a historic home located at St. Charles, St. Charles County, Missouri. It was built in 1895, and is a -story, Richardsonian Romanesque style yellow brick dwelling on a raised basement. It has a hipped roof with cross gables and features a round tower with a conical roof and large round arched opening over the entryway.

It was added to the National Register of Historic Places in 2013. It is located in the Midtown Neighborhood Historic District.

References

Individually listed contributing properties to historic districts on the National Register in Missouri
Houses on the National Register of Historic Places in Missouri
Richardsonian Romanesque architecture in Missouri
Houses completed in 1895
Buildings and structures in St. Charles County, Missouri
National Register of Historic Places in St. Charles County, Missouri